The American Tackle Football Federation of the Philippines (ATFFP) is the governing body of American football and tackle football in the Philippines. ATFFP was founded by Bernardo "Dodi" Palma II. The sporting body also manages the Philippines national American football team. It formerly organized ArenaBall Philippines, a local American football league which later became the Philippines Tackle Football League. This league folded in 2015 and has subsequently been replaced by the Philippine-American Football League.

See also
International Federation of American Football (IFAF)
IFAF Asia

References

Asian Federation of American Football
American Football
Philippines
American football in the Philippines